Neocollyris obscurofemorata is a species of ground beetle in the genus Neocollyris in the family Carabidae. It was described by Mandl in 1970.

References

Obscurofemorata, Neocollyris
Beetles described in 1970